The following is a list of association football stadiums in Mexico. Currently stadiums with a capacity of 5,000 or more are included.

Existing stadiums

Notes
Tamaulipas: The halfway line of the pitch at Estadio Tamaulipas lies along the border of Tampico and Madero with the northern half of the pitch belonging to Tampico and the southern half to Madero.

Future stadiums

See also
List of stadiums in Mexico
List of indoor arenas in Mexico
List of North American stadiums by capacity
List of football stadiums by capacity
List of stadiums

References

Mexico
Football stadiums in Mexico